{|

{{Infobox ship career
| Hide header = 
| Ship country = 
| Ship flag = 
| Ship name = *Europa (1993)
Silja Europa (1993-present)
| Ship namesake = 
| Ship owner = *1993–2003: Fährschiff Europa KB
2003–2006: Silja Line
2006 onwards: Tallink
| Ship operator = *1993–2013: Silja Line
2013–14: Tallink
2014–2016: Bridgeman Services
2016–onwards: Tallink
| Ship registry = *1993–2013: Mariehamn, 
2013 onwards: Tallinn, 
| Ship route = Helsinki–Tallinn
| Ship ordered = 6 October 1989
| Ship builder = Meyer Werft, Papenburg, West Germany
| Ship original cost = 
| Ship yard number = 627
| Ship way number = 
| Ship laid down = 6 November 1991
| Ship launched = 23 January 1993
| Ship sponsor = 
| Ship christened = 5 March 1993
| Ship completed = 6 March 1993
| Ship acquired = 
| Ship maiden voyage = 13 March 1993
| Ship in service = 1993–present
| Ship out of service = 
| Ship refit = (2014) Bridgeman
(2016) Tallink
| Ship identification = *Call sign: ESUJ

| Ship fate = 
| Ship status = In service
| Ship notes = 
}}

|}
MS Silja Europa is a cruiseferry constructed at Meyer Werft Germany for the Swedish ferry operator Rederi AB Slite, a part of Viking Line. At 59,914 gross tonnage (GT), she is the largest ship commissioned for and to ever operate for Tallink Silja, and is the tenth-largest cruiseferry in the world.

Just before she was due for delivery, Slite entered economic difficulties and could no longer afford the ship, so Meyer Werft kept her and she was soon chartered to Viking Line's rival, Silja Line. She was put on the Helsinki–Stockholm route, replacing MS Silja Serenade which was put to the Turku–Mariehamn–Stockholm route, but the two ships swapped routes with each other again in 1995.

History

MS Silja Europa was commissioned by Rederi AB Slite and launched on 23 January 1993. As a result of the 1990-1994 Swedish financial crisis, the Swedish krona was floated in 1992 and consequently lost value. The Europa became  more expensive for Slite, whose bank, Nordbanken, had stopped guaranteeing loans. Combined with the construction of other ships, Slite was declared bankrupt in April 1993.

She was christened the Silja Europa in Hamburg, Germany on 5 March 1993, then registered the next day to Fährschiff Europa KB. With a ten-year charter to Finnish cruisferry company Silja Line, Silja Europa made her maiden voyage on 14 March 1993.

On 28 September 1994 Silja Europa was the first vessel to receive the Mayday message from the sinking MS Estonia, and became the second vessel to arrive on-scene (after MS Mariella) following Estonia's capsizing and sinking. The captain of Silja Europa, Esa Mäkelä, was appointed On-Scene Commander for the rescue operation.

In January 2000, a catalytic converter was installed at Aker Finnyards in Rauma. The funnel received a new blue paintjob, and the ship's safety system was renewed. This was made following the incident of Estonia . 

Silja Line was sold to Estonian shipping company Tallink in May 2006 - the Silja Line brand was initially kept separate, but most of its ships (including the Silja Europa) are now in Tallink livery. Silja Europa's home port was changed to Tallinn and entered Tallink's Helsinki–Tallinn service on 23 January 2013. She was then sailed to Australia on a 14-month charter as an accommodation ship for the Gorgon LNG project at Barrow Island. After this charter, Tallink returned Silja Europa to their Helsinki-Tallinn service on 13 March 2016.

In 2021 she was hired by Devon and Cornwall Police for a ten-day period during which she is to be moored in Falmouth and used to accommodate police officers during a G7 summit in Carbis Bay scheduled for 11–13 June 2021. In October, she moved to the River Clyde and was berthed at Inchgreen Quay, Greenock, to provide accommodation for delegates at the COP26 summit.

Since September 2022 the MS Silja Europa is docked at Velsen-Noord to shelter 1,000 asylum seekers until February 2023. The ship arrived in Velsen-Noord on Wednesday September 21st. The ship passed through the IJmuiden Sea Lock at around 6:30 a.m. that morning and moored at the VOB (Velsen Offshore Base ) quay an hour later. 

Accidents and incidents
28 September 1994 Silja Europa was the first vessel to receive the Mayday message from the sinking MS Estonia, and became the second vessel to arrive on-scene (after MS Mariella) following Estonia's capsizing and sinking. The captain of Silja Europa, Esa Mäkelä, was appointed On-Scene Commander for the rescue operation.
13 January 1995 - Silja Europa ran aground close to Furusund, Sweden, due to a failure in the automatic speed control system. She continued under her own power to Stockholm, where she was taken out of service and then delivered to Naantali for repair.
10 October 1996 - A passenger reported that he saw someone jumping overboard. This was reported to the captain, who notified the Swedish Coast Guard - however, instead of stopping the ship (as is procedure), he continued to Stockholm. Later, the Swedish Coast Guard found the person, a female passenger, in the sea. Her body temperature was very low and she died a couple of days later in hospital of hypothermia. The ship's captain was prosecuted and found guilty of not stopping as he should have, but was not punished.
20 August 1997 - The ship collided with a German sailing-boat south of Lemland due to heavy fog. A German couple and their dog were rescued by one of Silja Europa'''s lifeboats. The sailing boat began to take on water and was later towed to Föglö by the Finnish Border Guard.
28 September 2002 - A female passenger fell overboard and swam to a nearby islet, from where she was later rescued
19 October 2019 - Two Finnish passengers (25 y/o and 21y/o) were found deceased in a cabin in the Port of Tallinn

See also
Largest ferries of Europe

References

External links
 

Ferries of Estonia
Ferries of Finland
Cruiseferries
Ships built in Papenburg
1993 ships